Tuuli Tomingas (born 4 January 1995) is an Estonian biathlete. She competes in the Biathlon World Cup.

Tomingas achieved her best results in the Biathlon World Cup at Kontiolahti, when she finished seventh in the sprint event.

Biathlon results
All results are sourced from the International Biathlon Union.

Olympic Games

World Championships

World Cup

*Results are from IBU races which include the Biathlon World Cup, Biathlon World Championships and the Winter Olympic Games.

Updated on 22 March 2021

Other competition

European Championships

Junior/Youth World Championships

References

External links

1995 births
Living people
Estonian female biathletes
Sportspeople from Tallinn
Biathletes at the 2022 Winter Olympics
Olympic biathletes of Estonia